Willinger is a surname. Notable people with the surname include:

Aloysius Joseph Willinger (1886–1973), American bishop
Jason Willinger (born 1971), American actor and voice actor
László Willinger (1909–1989), German photographer
Marian Willinger, American scientist
Wilhelm Willinger

German toponymic surnames